The Battle of Mahidpur was fought during the Third Anglo-Maratha War between the Holkar faction of the Maratha Confederacy and the British East India Company at Mahidpur, a town in the Malwa region, on 21 December 1817.

On 21 December 1817, the British, led by Sir Thomas Hislop, attacked the Holkar army led by 11-year-old Maharaja Malhar Rao Holkar III, 22-year-old Hari Rao Holkar and 20-year-old Bhima Bai Holkar. The Holkar artillery, led by Roshan Beg, attacked them with a long line of 63 cannons. At one point, the British were on the verge of losing the battle. However, they were helped by Gafur Khan, a traitor in the Holkar's camp. Khan deserted the battlefield with the force under his command. After this, the Holkars were decisively defeated.

Malhar Rao III, Tatya Jog and others escaped to Alot. A peace treaty was signed on 6 January 1818 at Mandsaur. Holkars accepted all the terms laid down by the British in the Treaty of Mandsaur. At the conclusion of this Third Anglo-Maratha War, the Holkars lost much of their territory to the British and were incorporated into the British Raj as a princely state of the Central India Agency.

This battle led to the final destruction of Maratha power. Baji Rao II, who was trying to consolidate Marathas, finally surrendered in June 1818. British abolished the position of Peshwa, and Marathas were limited to the small kingdom of Satara until its annexation to Bombay state in 1848.

References 

Mahidpur
Mahidpur
Mahidpur
History of Malwa
Mahidpur
Mahidpur
1817 in India
December 1817 events